The Budapest Philharmonic Orchestra (Hungarian: Budapesti Filharmóniai Társaság Zenekara) is Hungary's oldest extant orchestra. It was founded in 1853 by Ferenc Erkel under the auspices of the Budapest Philharmonic Society. For many years it was Hungary's only professional orchestra. The ensemble is an independent body, now organised by musicians of the Opera House, directed by the chairman-conductor and the board of directors. Its main concert venue is the Hungarian State Opera House, where they give around ten concerts per year. 

Since its foundation famous composers have given concerts with the orchestra. Franz Liszt travelled regularly to Budapest and appeared as guest conductor with them; among its other guest conductors over the past 150 years have been Brahms, Dvořák, and Mahler.

The Budapest Philharmonic Orchestra has made numerous concert tours to other European countries, the United States, and Japan.

History
The original members of the orchestra were drawn from musicians of the Hungarian National Theatre. Its first concert was on 20 November 1853, under the baton of Ferenc Erkel. The programme consisted of works by Beethoven (7th Symphony), Mozart, Mendelssohn and Meyerbeer.

Landmark events include:
 25 March 1865: the first complete performance in Budapest of Beethoven's Symphony No. 9 in D minor, "Choral"
 16 December 1870: the premiere of Liszt's Beethoven Cantata (No. 2, S. 68), written for the centenary of Beethoven's birth, conducted by the composer
 9 November, 1881: first performance of Johannes Brahms Piano Concerto No 2, played by Johannes Brahms and conducted by Alexander Erkel
 19 March 1888: the first performance in Hungary of Berlioz's Grande Messe des Morts (Requiem), conducted by Sándor Erkel
 20 November 1889: the world premiere of Mahler's Symphony No. 1 "Titan", conducted by the composer
 8 April 1907: the first performance in Hungary of Liszt's oratorio Christus This was Hans Richter's final appearance with the orchestra.

Many Hungarian composers have written works especially for the orchestra, including Erkel, Liszt, Goldmark, Dohnányi, Bartók, Kodály, Weiner, Kadosa and Szokolay. 

Many renowned foreign composers have conducted the Philharmonic Orchestra in performances of their works: Brahms, Dvořák, Mahler, Mascagni, Prokofiev, Ravel, Respighi, Richard Strauss and Stravinsky.  Other conductors to appear with the orchestra include Denes Agay, Eugen d'Albert, Édouard Colonne, Arthur Nikisch, Gabriel Pierné, Felix Weingartner, Bruno Walter, Erich Kleiber and Otto Klemperer.

Chairmen-conductors
The chairmen-conductors of the orchestra have been:
 1853-1871: Ferenc Erkel
 1875-1900: Sándor Erkel (Ferenc Erkel's son)
 1900-1918: István Kerner
 1919-1944: Ernő Dohnányi
 1960-1967: János Ferencsik
 1967-1986: András Kóródi
 1989-1994: Erich Bergel
 1997-2005: Rico Saccani
 2011-2014: György Győriványi Ráth
2014-current: Pinchas Steinberg

Gallery

See also
 Hungarian State Opera

References

Sources
 History of the Philharmonic Society - official website of the orchestra
 Encyclopædia Britannica - "Budapest Philharmonic Orchestra"

External links
Official site

Hungarian orchestras
Musical groups established in 1853
Symphony orchestras